József Galambos (27 July 1900 – 6 February 1980) was a Hungarian long-distance runner. He competed in the marathon at the 1928 Summer Olympics.

Galambos won the Košice Peace Marathon four times between 1927 and 1933.

References

External links
 

1900 births
1980 deaths
Athletes (track and field) at the 1928 Summer Olympics
Hungarian male long-distance runners
Hungarian male marathon runners
Olympic athletes of Hungary
Sportspeople from Szabolcs-Szatmár-Bereg County
20th-century Hungarian people